Paula Losoya Taylor (also Paula Losoya de Rivers,? - July 17, 1902) was one of the founders of San Felipe Del Rio (later, Del Rio) in Texas. Her hacienda in Del Rio became a major employer in the region, and  an important gathering spot for worship, discussion, and more. Taylor donated land to create a Catholic cemetery, a fort, and schools in Del Rio.

Biography 

Taylor was born in Guerrero, Tamaulipas. Taylor and her sister, Refugio Losoya de Rivera first came to the Del Rio region known as Las Zapas in 1862, moving from Rio Grande City with their husbands. Also in 1862, Taylor built the first hacienda in Del Rio. The remains of the hacienda are known locally as the Rivers Home. Taylor and her sister began to cultivate the land of their hacienda right away, hiring workers from Las Zapas. Their hiring of Mexican workers increased migration from Mexico into the San Felipe area of Del Rio. Taylor was also involved, along with her husband, with creating the first acequias in the area, the first of which was called Acequia Madre.

On April 4, 1876, her husband died and left the property and possessions to Taylor. Some sources indicate that she married another man, who may have been known as Charles Rivers or Rivera, in December 1876.

On the estate, the two sisters and Taylor's family continued to work and grow. She helped raise some of her relative's children. The two sisters also arranged to have Catholic priests from Eagle Pass say mass for the estate, and the many of the residents of San Feilipe Del Rio would attend. Residents attended mass at her hacienda until 1895, when the church established Sacred Heart in Del Rio. The hacienda also included a sugarcane mill, flour mill, a gin, and a Mexican-style candy factory.

Mexican people in the area had no place to bury their dead, so in 1884, Taylor donated four acres of her land to create a cemetery for Mexican people. The land she donated was marked by a cross at the top of the hill and already had five burials. This area later became Cemeterio Viejo Loma de la Cruz. Taylor also donated 60 acres of her land to build a fort for defense of the town and more land to build area schools.

Taylor died on July 17, 1902. In 1976, La Hacienda was published, which described the history of Del Rio and featured Taylor's estate. Taylor is depicted in a mural at Moore Park in Del Rio. A Texas Historical Marker is located at her hacienda and was erected in 1982.

References 

People from Del Rio, Texas
People from Tamaulipas
American people of Mexican descent
Ranchers